Dae Ijin (r. 830–857) was the 11th king of the Balhae kingdom, which existed from AD 698 to 926 and occupied parts of Manchuria and northern Korea. The era name of his reign was Hamhwa (咸和, 함화).

He was preceded by his grandfather, Seon of Balhae. The king made efforts for the consolidation of a centralized administrative system and organized a standing army.

See also
List of Korean monarchs
History of Korea

References

857 deaths
Balhae rulers
9th-century rulers in Asia
Year of birth unknown